The men's 200 metres event at the 1999 Summer Universiade was held at the Estadio Son Moix in Palma de Mallorca, Spain on 8 and 9 July.

Medalists

Results

Heats
Wind:Heat 1: -2.1 m/s, Heat 2: -4.5 m/s, Heat 3: -1.8 m/s, Heat 4: -1.8 m/s, Heat 5: +0.1 m/s, Heat 6: -1.4 m/s, Heat 7: -2.9 m/s, Heat 8: -1.9 m/s

Quarterfinals
Wind:Heat 1: +1.4 m/s, Heat 2: +0.8 m/s, Heat 3: +2.5 m/s, Heat 4: +1.7 m/s

Semifinals
Wind:Heat 1: -2.1 m/s, Heat 2: -2.9 m/s

Final
Wind: -1.0 m/s

References

Athletics at the 1999 Summer Universiade
1999